The Caldwell catalogue is an astronomical catalogue of 109 star clusters, nebulae, and galaxies for observation by amateur astronomers. The list was compiled by Patrick Moore as a complement to the Messier catalogue.

While the Messier catalogue is used by amateur astronomers as a list of deep-sky objects for observation, Moore noted that Messier's list was not compiled for that purpose and excluded many of the sky's brightest deep-sky objects, such as the Hyades, the Double Cluster (NGC 869 and NGC 884), and the Sculptor Galaxy (NGC 253). The Messier catalogue was actually compiled as a list of known objects that might be confused with comets. Moore also observed that since Messier compiled his list from observations in Paris, it did not include bright deep-sky objects visible in the Southern Hemisphere, such as Omega Centauri, Centaurus A, the Jewel Box, and 47 Tucanae. Moore compiled a list of 109 objects to match the commonly accepted number of Messier objects (he excluded M110), and the list was published in Sky & Telescope in December 1995.

Moore used his other surname – Caldwell – to name the list, since the initial of "Moore" is already used for the Messier catalogue. Entries in the catalogue are designated with a "C" and the catalogue number (1 to 109).

Unlike objects in the Messier catalogue, which are listed roughly in the order of discovery by Messier and his colleagues, the Caldwell catalogue is ordered by declination, with C1 being the most northerly and C109 being the most southerly, although two objects (NGC 4244 and the Hyades) are listed out of sequence. Other errors in the original list have since been corrected: it incorrectly identified the S Norma Cluster (NGC 6087) as NGC 6067 and incorrectly labelled the Lambda Centauri Cluster (IC 2944) as the Gamma Centauri Cluster.

Caldwell star chart

Number of objects by type in the Caldwell catalogue

Caldwell objects

See also 
 Messier Catalogue
 Herschel 400 Catalogue
 New General Catalogue (NGC)
 Index Catalogue (IC)
 Revised New General Catalogue (RNGC)
 Revised Index Catalogue (RIC)

References

External links 

 The Caldwell Catalogue at SEDS
 The Caldwell Club
 Caldwell Star Charts, Images and more
 Searchable Caldwell Catalogue list
 Clickable Caldwell Object table

Astronomical catalogues